Events from the year 1564 in France

Incumbents
 Monarch – Charles IX

Events
22 June – French settlers abandon Charlesfort, the first French attempt at colonizing the modern-day United States, and establish Fort Caroline in Florida
Edict of Roussillon

Births
7 March – Pierre Coton, Jesuit (died 1626)
24 November – Joseph Gaultier de la Vallette, astronomer (died 1647)

Full date missing
Jean D'Espagnet, polymath: lawyer, politician, mathematician, alchemist, antiquarian and poet (died c.1637)

Deaths

19 February – Guillaume Morel, scholar (born 1505)
April – Pierre Belon, explorer (born 1517)
27 May – John Calvin, theologian, principal developer of the system later called Calvinism (born 1509)

Full date missing
Jean de Tournes, printer, book publisher and bookseller (born 1504)
Philibert Jambe de Fer, composer (fl. 1548)
Jacques Brunel, organist and composer
Jourdan des Ursins, Corsican military officer (born 1500)
Masseot Abaquesne, faience manufacturer (born c.1500)

See also

References

1560s in France